In the 1934 season of the Campeonato Carioca, two championships were disputed, each by a different league.

AMEA Championship 

The edition of the Campeonato Carioca organized by AMEA started on April 8, 1934. The championship began with all the ten teams that had finished the championship of the previous year, but in early June, a series of events that resulted on half the teams leaving the championship began. the severely reduced championship only ended on January 13, 1935. Botafogo won the championship for the 7th time. no teams were relegated.

Participating teams

System 
The tournament would be disputed in a double round-robin format, with the team with the most points winning the title.

Championship 

Due to the unbalanced amount of matches that the remaining teams had, for title awarding purposes, it was decided that the team with less points lost would win the title and that the matches against the five teams that had abandoned the championship wouldn't be annulled.

LCF Championship 

The edition of the Campeonato Carioca organized by LCF (Liga Carioca de Football, or Carioca Football League) kicked off on April 1, 1934 and ended on August 12, 1934. Six teams participated. Vasco da Gama won the championship for the 4th time. no teams were relegated.

Participating teams

System 
The tournament would be disputed in a double round-robin format, with the team with the most points winning the title.

Championship

References 

Campeonato Carioca seasons
Carioca